Auchterlonie or Ouchterlony, Scottish surname from Forfar in the county of Angus, may refer to:

 Dorothy Auchterlonie (1915–1991), academic
 Laurie Auchterlonie (1868–1948), golfer
 William Auchterlonie (1872–1963), golfer
 James Auchterlony,  a soldier in Regiment of Jacob Shaw, in Russian service from 1610th. In 1672 James Auchterlony served as a witness to the will of Alexander 11th Lord Forbes in Stockholm.
 Örjan Ouchterlony (1914–2004) was a Swedish bacteriologist and immunologist who is credited with the creation of the Ouchterlony double immuno diffusion test in the 1940s.

 Ouchterlony, Swedish noble family of Scottish origin. Descents of John Ouchterlony († 1778), from Dundee in Scotland.

Notes

References 
 

Surnames of Scottish origin